Cohors [prima] Aelia Gaesatorum milliaria [peditata] sagittaria ("[1st infantry 1000 strong] archer Aelian cohort of Gaesati") was a Roman auxiliary infantry regiment. The cohort stationed in Dacia, at castrum Resculum, and in Pannonia.

References
 Academia Română: Istoria Românilor, Vol. 2, Daco-romani, romanici, alogeni, 2nd. Ed., București, 2010, 
 Constantin C. Petolescu: Dacia - Un mileniu de istorie, Ed. Academiei Române, 2010, 
 Vieser, Dolores:, Aelia - Eine Frau aus Rom - Roman., 1952, Graz, Styria,
 Vieser, Dolores:, Aelia - Die Frau des Norikers - Roman., 1970, Klagenfurt, Johannes Keyn, o.J. um 1970.
 Meshorer, Ya'akov, The Coinage of Aelia Capitolina, 1989, Jerusalem: The Israel Museum Press, 1989
 DE CHAMBRUN comte, Aelia, une étude d'esthétique, 1890, Paris, G. Chamerot 1890
 Leo Kadman, The Coins of Aelia Capitolina, 1956, Universitas Publishers, Jerusalem
 Aelia Flavia Flacilla, '800
 Dahl, Friedrich ; Zoologisches Museum Berlin (Hrsg.) / Karg, Wolfgang (Autor):, Raubmilben. Acari (Acarina), Milben. Parasitiformes (Anactinochaeta). Cohors Gamasina Leach.( = 59. Teil von: Die Tierwelt Deutschlands und der angrenzenden * * Meeresteile nach ihren Merkmalen und nach ihrer Lebensweise. Begründet von Professor Dr. Friedrich Dahl. Herausgegeben vom Zoologischen Museum Berlin)., 1993, Gustav Fischer Verlag Jena-Stuttgart-New York, 2. überarb. Aufl. 1993.

See also 
 Roman auxiliaries
 List of Roman auxiliary regiments

Military of ancient Rome
Auxiliary peditata units of ancient Rome
Roman Dacia